Ullswater is the second largest lake in the English Lake District, being about  long and  wide, with a maximum depth a little over . It was scooped out by a glacier in the Last Ice Age.

Geography
It is a typical Lake District "ribbon lake", formed after the last ice age by a glacier scooping out the valley floor, which then filled with meltwater. Ullswater was formed by three glaciers. Surrounding hills give it the shape of an extenuated "Z" with three segments or reaches winding through them. For much of its length, Ullswater formed the border between the historic counties of Cumberland and Westmorland.

Etymology
The origin of the name Ullswater is uncertain. Whaley suggests "Ulf's lake", from Old Norse personal name Ulfr plus Middle English water, influenced in usage by the Old Norse vatn (water or lake). Ulfr is also the Old Norse noun meaning wolf, and Hutchinson thought that the name might refer to the lake as a resort of wolves, or to its elbow-shaped bend (citing a Celtic ulle)."

Some say it comes from the name of a Nordic chief named Ulf, who ruled over the area. There was also a Saxon Lord of Greystoke called Ulphus, whose land bordered the lake. The lake may have been named Ulf's Water in honour of either of these, or after the Norse god Ullr. Hodgson Hill, an earthwork on the north-east shoreline of Ullswater may be the remains of a Viking fortified settlement.

Settlements
Glenridding, is situated at the southern end of the lake, Pooley Bridge is at the northern end, other villages situated on Ullswater include Howtown, Sandwick and Watermillock.

Ullswater is overlooked by Dunmallard Hill, which was the site of an Iron Age fort, on the western side of the lake is the Aira Force waterfall.

Activities
The lake has been a tourist destination since the mid-18th century. By the 1890s, Ullswater had become a fashionable holiday destination for the British aristocracy, thanks to its good sailing conditions and proximity to fell shooting estates. In 1912, Wilhelm II, German Emperor visited Ullswater and toured the lake on the MY Raven, which was re-fitted to act as a royal yacht. A shooting lodge (The Bungalow) was constructed for the Kaiser at Martindale by the major local landowner, Hugh Lowther, 5th Earl of Lonsdale.

Ullswater's attractions include the Ullswater "Steamers" which offer trips around the lake calling at Pooley Bridge, Glenridding, Howtown and Aira Force. These sail all the year round and were originally working boats which from the 1850s moved mail, workers and goods to and from the Greenside Mine at Glenridding, which closed in 1962. 

A  walking route the Ullswater Way was officially opened in 2016 by writer and broadcaster Eric Robson. The route can be walked in either direction and from any starting point. 

Ullswater is also a sailing location with several marinas round the lake. It is home to the Ullswater Yacht Club and the Lord Birkett Memorial Trophy, held annually on the first weekend in July. This regularly attracts over 200 sailing boats for two races covering the length of the lake. There are also facilities for diving, rowing and motorboats. Another of attraction is the waterfall of Aira Force, midway along the lake on the western side. Ullswater lies partly within the National Trust's Ullswater and Aira Force property. Close to the falls is Lyulph's Tower, a pele tower or castellated building built by a former Duke of Norfolk as a shooting box. The Sharrow Bay Country House hotel stands on the lake's eastern shore.

Donald Campbell set the world water speed record on Ullswater on 23 July 1955, when he piloted the jet-propelled hydroplane "Bluebird K7" to a speed of 202.32 mph (325.53 km/h).

Ullswater Lake is a popular tourist destination containing many campsites, static caravan parks, and holiday parks. The rural setting gives plenty of space for pitching tents as well as woodland shelter and screening.

Ullswater geese deaths 
In 2022 greylag geese on the lake were seen to be dragged underwater by several witnesses on different occasions. The cause in unknown though there was speculation that a large pike, a wels catfish or an otter was responsible. Dr Roger Sweeting, of the Freshwater Biological Association, also suggested that the birds could have become entangled in discarded fishing line and had become exhausted, losing their stability.

Notable people
Just south of Pooley Bridge on the lake's eastern shore is Eusemere, where anti-slavery campaigner Thomas Clarkson (1760–1846) lived; the house gives one of the best views of the lower reach of Ullswater. William and Dorothy Wordsworth were friends of Clarkson and visited on many occasions. After visiting Clarkson in April 1802, Wordsworth was inspired to write his famous poem Daffodils after seeing daffodils growing on the shores of Ullswater on his journey back to Grasmere. Wordsworth once wrote of "Ullswater, as being, perhaps, upon the whole, the happiest combination of beauty and grandeur, which any of the Lakes affords".

The politician William Marshall lived on the Ullswater shore at Watermillock. His descendants, the diplomat Sir Cecil Spring Rice and his brother Stephen Spring Rice, were brought up there. Nearby Aira Force has several memorials to members of the Spring family.

In 1962 Lord Birkett led a campaign to prevent Ullswater from becoming a reservoir. He died one day after the proposition was defeated in the House of Lords and he is commemorated with a plaque on Kailpot Crag. The Birkett Regatta, held each year in early July, involves a two-day round-the-island race in Birkett's memory, 2018 was the 60th anniversary of the event, with Lord Birkett's granddaughter in attendance.

Gallery

See also
 Lake District National Park

References

External links

Ullswater and Aira Force information at the National Trust
Ullswater Yacht Club
Ullswater 'Steamers'
Ullswater Information, Photos and Events
The Cumbria Directory - Ullswater

Tourist attractions in Cumbria
Lakes of the Lake District
Eden District
National Trust properties in the Lake District
Cumberland
Westmorland
LUllswater